The Clerk Marshal (also spelled Clerk Martial) was an official of the British Royal Household in the department of the Master of the Horse. From the Restoration the office was held with that of Avenor until the latter post was abolished in 1793. The office of Clerk Marshal was then combined with that of First or Chief Equerry until 1874. From 1841 the holder was a member of the Government, but the office ceased to be a political one from 1866.

The duties of the Clerk Marshal were to swear in the officers of the Master of the Horse's department, and for the payment of all officers and servants. He was also responsible for submitting the accounts of the department to the Board of Green Cloth. Clerks Marshal were appointed in the households of other members of the Royal Family as well.

List of Clerks Marshal

to King Charles II 
 8 June 1660: George Barker
 18 August 1660: Richard Mason
 10 September 1671: Joseph Cragg

to King James II 
 21 April 1685: Thomas Morley

to King William III and Queen Mary II 
 10 April 1688: William Ryder
 12 March 1689: Anthony Rowe
 27 April 1694: John Latton

to Queen Anne 
 23 June 1702: Hugh Chudleigh
 6 November 1707: Thomas Lister
 12 June 1711: Conyers Darcy

to King George I 
 29 September 1714: Conyers Darcy
 10 June 1717: Francis Negus

to King George II 
 20 June 1727: Francis Negus
 9 September 1732: vacant
 22 April 1734: Hon. James Lumley
 11 March 1741: Edmund Charles Blomberg
 8 November 1757: Courthorpe Clayton

to King George III 
 15 December 1760: Timothy Carr
 6 April 1771: Benjamin Carpenter (Chief Equerry from 1 January 1783)
 9 March 1788: Philip Goldsworthy
 6 January 1801: Robert Manners

to the Prince Regent, later King George IV 
 24 March 1812: Benjamin Bloomfield (knighted 1815)
 25 August 1817: Francis Thomas Hammond (knighted 1819)

to King William IV 
 16 July 1830: Sir Andrew Francis Barnard

to Queen Adelaide 
 2 January 1846: Sir Andrew Francis Barnard

to Queen Victoria 
 20 July 1837: Henry Frederick Compton Cavendish
 10 September 1841: Lord Charles Wellesley
 7 July 1846: Lord Alfred Paget
 28 February 1852: Lord Colville of Culross
 30 December 1852: Lord Alfred Paget
 26 February 1858: Lord Colville of Culross
 1 July 1859: Lord Alfred Paget (held office until 1892)

to Prince Albert 
 2 January 1842: William Wemyss
 8 March 1853: Alexander Nelson Hood

to King Edward VII 
 1 January 1904: Sir Stanley de Astel Calvert Clarke (also Chief Equerry until 9 October 1908)

References 

 

Positions within the British Royal Household